George Sanger may refer to:
 Lord George Sanger (1825–1911), English circus proprietor
 George Sanger (musician) (born 1957), American video game composer
 George P. Sanger (1831–1894), American lawyer, editor, judge, and businessman